The German standard DIN 66003, also known as Code page 1011 (CCSID 1011; abbreviated CP1011) by IBM, Code page 20106 (abbreviated CP20106) by Microsoft and D7DEC by Oracle, is a modification of 7-bit ASCII with adaptations for the German language, replacing certain symbol characters with umlauts and the eszett. It is the German national version of ISO/IEC 646 (ISO 646-DE), and also a localised option in DEC's National Replacement Character Set (NRCS) for their VT220 terminals.

It is registered with the ISO-IR registry for use with ISO/IEC 2022 as ISO-IR-21. Kermit calls it , but also accepts the IANA-registered name . Other IANA-registered names include ,  and simply .

Code page layout

See also
National Replacement Character Set (NRCS)

References

External links
 DIN 66003 purchase page
 Roman Czyborra: ISO 646 (Good old ASCII)
 Airport display mojibake arising from the differences between DIN 66003 and ASCII

1011
66003